The Casal collar or Casal necklace is a clinical sign in which there is an erythematous pigmented skin rash in the distribution of a broad collar (dermatomes C3 and C4). It is seen in patients with pellagra, as a result of niacin (vitamin B3) deficiency. 

The sign is named after Gaspar Casal, who first described pellagra.

References

External links 
 Image of Casal collar at phoenity.com Accessed on 22 March 2009.

Medical signs
Dermatologic signs